Hale County is the name of two counties in the United States:
Hale County, Alabama
Hale County, Texas